Patrick Dellit (born 21 August 1986) is an Australian rugby union footballer. His regular playing position is either as a centre or a winger. He currently represents the Western Force in Super Rugby. He made his debut for the franchise during the 2011 Super Rugby season against the Lions in Johannesburg.

Super Rugby statistics

References

External links 
Western Force profile
itsrugby.co.uk profile

1986 births
Australian rugby union players
Western Force players
Rugby union centres
Rugby union wings
Rugby union players from Sydney
Living people
New South Wales Country Eagles players